Sedrick Mbuyamba Kalombo (born 8 February 1995) is an Italian professional footballer who plays as a midfielder for Minyor Pernik. He is of DR Congolese descent.

Club career
Kalombo made his Serie C debut for Lecce on 10 March 2013 in a game against Lumezzane.

On 31 January 2019, he joined Rimini on loan.

On 31 January 2020, he was loaned to Rieti.

On 3 October 2020, he joined Foggia on loan.

References

External links
 

1995 births
People from Fano
Sportspeople from the Province of Pesaro and Urbino
Italian people of Democratic Republic of the Congo descent
Italian sportspeople of African descent
Living people
Italian footballers
Association football defenders
U.S. Lecce players
A.S.G. Nocerina players
A.S. Martina Franca 1947 players
A.S. Gubbio 1910 players
U.S. Salernitana 1919 players
A.S. Pro Piacenza 1919 players
Rimini F.C. 1912 players
F.C. Rieti players
Calcio Foggia 1920 players
FC Tsarsko Selo Sofia players
Serie B players
Serie C players
Serie D players
First Professional Football League (Bulgaria) players
Italian expatriate footballers
Expatriate footballers in Bulgaria
Footballers from Marche